John Martin "Joe" Paton (5 September 1878 – 21 August 1952) was an Australian rules footballer who played with Carlton in the Victorian Football League (VFL).

Family
The son of Robert Paton (1849-1926), and Mary Ann Paton (1851-1888), née Martin, John Martin Paton was born at Williamstown, Victoria on 5 September 1878.

Death
He died at Williamstown, Victoria on 21 August 1952.

Notes

References

External links 
 
 
 Joe Paton's playing statistics from The VFA Project
 Joe Paton's profile at Blueseum

1878 births
1952 deaths
Australian rules footballers from Melbourne
Carlton Football Club (VFA) players
Carlton Football Club players
North Melbourne Football Club (VFA) players
People from Williamstown, Victoria